Polyherbal formulation (PHF) is the use of more than one herb in a medicinal preparation.  The concept is found in Ayurvedic and other traditional medicinal systems where multiple herbs in a particular ratio may be used in the treatment of illness. It is used in these systems for the treatment of many diseases, including diabetes. Historically, the Ayurvedic literature “Sarangdhar Samhita” dated centuries ago in 1300 A. D. has highlighted the concept of polyherbalism in this ancient medicinal system. In the traditional system of Indian medicine, plant formulations and combined extracts of plants are chosen rather than individual ones. It is known that Ayurvedic herbals are prepared in a number of dosage forms, in which mostly all of them are PHF. Due to synergism, polyherbalism confers some benefits which is not available in single herbal formulation.

References

Ayurveda
Herbs
South Asian traditional medicine